Claes Holger de Vreese (born 25 September 1974, Copenhagen) is a Danish Professor of Political Communication at the Amsterdam School of Communication Research (ASCoR) at the department of Communication Science at the University of Amsterdam (UvA). In addition, he is Affiliated Professor of Political Science and Journalism at the University of Southern Denmark (SDU). De Vreese is the founding Director of the Center for Politics and Communication. He is member of the Royal Netherlands Academy of Arts and Sciences (KNAW) and the chair of its Social Science Council. Between 2005 and 2013, he was the Director of ASCoR and the Director of the Netherlands School of Communication Research (NeSCoR).

Research
Research interests of De Vreese include public opinion on European integration, the effects of news, the effects of information and campaigning on direct democracy and referendums, and the effects of effects of information and campaigning on elections. Many of his articles involve comparative journalism research.

In total, De Vreese has published more than 150 articles in peer-reviewed academic journals. Titles include: Communication Research, European Journal of Political Research, European Union Politics, International Journal of Public Opinion Research, Journal of Communication, Journal of Politics, Political Communication, Public Opinion Quarterly, and West European Politics.

Since 2014, De Vreese is the Editor in Chief of the international journal Political Communication.

Grants
De Vreese has received grants from international science foundations and EU research programs, including grants from the European Research Council (ERC). In addition, he received the Vici grant and Veni grant from the Netherlands Organisation for Scientific Research (NWO).

Awards
De Vreese has received several awards for his research, including the Nils Klim Prize by the Norwegian Holberg Prize Foundation, and awards by the Danish Science Foundation and International Communication Association.

References

External links
 Website of Claes H. de Vreese
 Employee profile at University of Amsterdam
 Amsterdam School of Communication Research ASCoR 
 Center for Politics and Communication
 Political Communication (journal)

1970 births
Living people
Academic staff of the University of Southern Denmark
Danish expatriates in the Netherlands
Members of the Royal Netherlands Academy of Arts and Sciences
People from Copenhagen
University of Amsterdam alumni
Academic staff of the University of Amsterdam